Biggin is a village in the Derbyshire Dales district of Derbyshire, England.  It is part of the Hartington Nether Quarter parish, and is in the Peak District National Park.

Biggin was once known as Newbiggin, when it had a monastic settlement of the Cistercian order, established by the monks of Garendon Abbey, Leicestershire. The monks established a sheep ranch at Biggin Grange, which still has one ancient outbuilding. Farming is still important to the village, though at one time (18th Century) it was also a centre of lead mining. When the lead started to be worked out, there was a migration of lead miners to Upper Teesdale, and they probably took the name Newbiggin there. Today tourism is an important industry alongside farming.

See also
 Listed buildings in Hartington Nether Quarter
 Dovedale
 Tissington Trail

References

External links

Biggin tourist site with reference to mining
Biggin tourist site
Other Biggin tourist site

Villages in Derbyshire
Towns and villages of the Peak District
Derbyshire Dales